The 2021 WWE Draft was the 16th WWE Draft produced by the American professional wrestling promotion WWE between their Raw and SmackDown brand divisions. The two-night event began with the October 1 episode of Friday Night SmackDown (in Baltimore, Maryland) and concluded with the October 4 episode of Monday Night Raw (in Nashville, Tennessee), with SmackDown airing on Fox and Raw on the USA Network. Unlike previous drafts, in which results took effect immediately, the results of the 2021 draft did not go into effect until the October 22 episode of SmackDown.

Production

Background
The WWE Draft is an annual process used by the American professional wrestling promotion WWE while a brand extension, or brand split, is in effect. The original brand extension occurred from 2002 to 2011, while the second and current brand split began in 2016. During a brand extension, the company divides its roster into brands where the wrestlers exclusively perform for each brand's respective television show, and the draft is used to refresh the rosters of the brand divisions, typically between the Raw and SmackDown brands. The 2021 draft was WWE's 16th draft and was officially announced during the September 13 episode of Raw. It was scheduled to occur during the October 1 and October 4 episodes of SmackDown and Raw, respectively, with SmackDown airing on Fox and Raw on the USA Network.

2021 draft rules
The rules of the 2021 draft were revealed by WWE correspondent Megan Morant on Twitter during the day before the first night of the draft on October 1. Over 60 wrestlers (including tag teams) were eligible to be drafted across the two nights, with half being eligible the first night and the other half eligible the second night; however, no draft pools were revealed for which wrestlers were eligible for each night. Tag teams were counted as one pick unless Fox or USA Network officials (who were promoted as draft decision makers) specifically only wanted one member of the team. Wrestlers from NXT were also eligible to be drafted to either Raw or SmackDown, while any non-NXT wrestlers who were not drafted became (kayfabe) free agents and could sign with the brand of their choice. Unlike previous drafts, in which results took effect immediately, results of the 2021 draft did not become effective until the October 22 episode of SmackDown, the night after the Crown Jewel pay-per-view and livestreaming event.

Selections

Night 1: SmackDown (October 1)
There were four rounds of draft picks during night 1 of the 2021 draft. Unlike previous drafts in which Raw received three picks and SmackDown only received two, both brands had two picks each round. WWE officials Adam Pearce and Sonya Deville announced the draft picks.

Notes
One stable was split up as a result of the first night: Austin Theory was drafted to Raw while his Way stablemates, Johnny Gargano, Dexter Lumis, Candice LeRae, and Indi Hartwell, remained on NXT.

Night 1 supplemental picks (October 1–2)
These picks were announced on October 1 via WWE's social media accounts and on the October 2 episode of Talking Smack.

Notes
One tag team was split up as a result of the supplemental draft: Mace was drafted to SmackDown while his tag team partner T-Bar remained on Raw.

Night 2: Raw (October 4)
There were six rounds of draft picks during night 2 of the 2021 draft. Like the first night, both brands had two picks each round. WWE officials Adam Pearce and Sonya Deville again announced the draft picks.

Notes
One stable was split up as a result of the second night: Xia Li was drafted to SmackDown while her Tian Sha stablemates, Boa and Mei Ying, remained on NXT.
One tag team was split up as a result of the second night: Ridge Holland was drafted to SmackDown while his tag team partner Pete Dunne remained on NXT.

Night 2 supplemental picks (October 4)
These picks were announced on the October 4 episode of Raw Talk.

Notes
One stable was split up as a result of the supplemental draft: Veer stayed on Raw while his stablemates, Jinder Mahal and Shanky, were drafted to SmackDown.
Two tag teams were split up as a result of the supplemental draft: Tegan Nox was drafted to Raw while her tag team partner Shotzi stayed on SmackDown, and Tamina was drafted to Raw while her tag team partner Natalya stayed on SmackDown.

Free agents
Several wrestlers were made free agents due to injury, inactivity, or simply not being drafted despite being an active member of the rosters. Free agents can (kayfabe) sign with the brand of their choosing. The chart is organized by date.

Aftermath
During the draft, Raw drafted SmackDown Women's Champion Becky Lynch while SmackDown drafted Raw Women's Champion Charlotte Flair. Neither lost their respective championship before the October 22 episode of SmackDown, the night that the draft results went into effect. The day of the show, WWE announced that Flair and Lynch would exchange titles to keep the championships on their respective brands. In turn, Lynch became the Raw Women's Champion while Flair became the SmackDown Women's Champion.

Also during the draft, SmackDown drafted NXT North American Champion Isaiah "Swerve" Scott as part of his stable, Hit Row. Swerve claimed he would be taking the title to SmackDown, however, on the October 12 episode of NXT 2.0, Swerve lost the championship to Carmelo Hayes, thus keeping the North American Championship on NXT before the draft results went into effect on October 22.

In November, vignettes began airing to hype Veer's post-draft appearance on Raw. His ring name was changed to Veer Mahaan. He finally debuted in April 2022, but in October, he was moved to NXT.

On November 4, 2021, WWE released several wrestlers due to budget cuts. Mia Yim, Hit Row's B-Fab, Nia Jax, Karrion Kross, and Keith Lee were among those who were released, without a single appearance post-draft. Among those not drafted who were released included Eva Marie and Lucha House Party (Gran Metalik and Lince Dorado). Several NXT wrestlers were also released, including Franky Monet, Oney Lorcan, Ember Moon, Jeet Rama, Katrina Cortez, Trey Baxter, Zayda Ramier, Jessi Kamea, Harry Smith, and Kross' real-life fiancé, Scarlett, who served as Kross' on-screen manager when Kross was still in NXT and she was expected to eventually join Kross on Raw. On November 18, the remainder of Hit Row, John Morrison, Tegan Nox, Shane Thorne, Drake Maverick, and Jaxson Ryker were also released. Not long after, Jeff Hardy would be released on December 9 after being sent home from a live event tour and refusing rehab.  On December 29, Toni Storm requested and was immediately granted a release from her contract.  On February 24, 2022, it was reported that Cesaro and WWE had failed to agree on new contract terms and that he had quietly left WWE when his contract expired, ending his 11-year tenure in the company.

At WrestleMania 38 in April 2022, SmackDown's Universal Champion Roman Reigns defeated Raw's WWE Champion Brock Lesnar to win both championships, thus allowing Reigns to appear on both brands as the Undisputed WWE Universal Champion, then in May 2022, SmackDown Tag Team Champions The Usos (Jey Uso and Jimmy Uso) defeated Raw Tag Team Champions RK-Bro (Randy Orton and Riddle) to win both championships, thus allowing The Usos to appear on both brands as the Undisputed WWE Tag Team Champions. By proxy, this allowed other members of The Bloodline stable (Sami Zayn, Solo Sikoa, who was promoted from NXT to SmackDown in September, and the group's manager Paul Heyman) to appear on both brands.

Also in April 2022, Mustafa Ali was moved back to Raw, then in June, Apollo Crews and Commander Azeez were moved to NXT. At Money in the Bank in July,  Liv Morgan won the women's Money in the Bank ladder match, and later that same night, she cashed in the contract and won the SmackDown Women's Championship, subsequently transferring her to SmackDown. Later in October, Rey Mysterio was transferred to the SmackDown brand, and in turn, Happy Corbin, who returned to his Baron Corbin name, was moved to Raw. Also in October, Zelina Vega was moved back to SmackDown to be the manager of Legado Del Fantasma (Santos Escobar, Joaquin Wilde, and Cruz Del Toro), who were promoted to SmackDown from NXT. After taking time off in mid-2022, Reggie returned on NXT under a new gimmick and ring name of Scrypts. Shortly after, T-Bar returned to NXT as Dijak. Upon his return from an injury in January 2023, Rick Boogs was transferred to the Raw brand. Doudrop also returned to her previous name Piper Niven, which she used in NXT UK.

After Triple H took over creative control of WWE in July 2022, several released wrestlers who were part of the 2021 draft were rehired. These included Mia Yim returning on Raw, and Hit Row (Ashante Adonis, Top Dolla, and B-Fab), Tegan Nox, and Karrion Kross and his real-life fiancé, Scarlett, returning on SmackDown. Nia Jax made a one-night return at the 2023 Royal Rumble, where she was the #30 entrant, being eliminated by all other women in the ring.

Notes

References

 

WWE Draft
WWE draft
Professional wrestling in Baltimore
Professional wrestling in Nashville, Tennessee
October 2021 events in the United States
Events in Baltimore
Events in Nashville, Tennessee